Edward Francis Healey Jr. (December 28, 1894 – December 9, 1978) was an American professional football player in the National Football League (NFL). Regarded as one of the best linemen in the league's early days, Healey was inducted into the Pro Football Hall of Fame as part of its second induction class in 1964. He was also named in 1969 to the NFL 1920s All-Decade Team. In 1974, he was also inducted into the College Football Hall of Fame.

A native of Springfield, Massachusetts, Healey played college football at College of the Holy Cross in 1914 and at Dartmouth College in 1916, 1917, and 1919.

Healey played professional football as a tackle in the NFL for the Rock Island Independents from 1920 to 1922 and for the Chicago Bears from 1922 to 1927. He never played for a team with a losing record during his NFL career and, in 1922, became the first player in NFL history to be sold to another team. He was named as a first-team All Pro player by at least one selector for five consecutive years from 1922 to 1926.

Early years
Healey was born in 1894 in Indian Orchard, a neighborhood at the northeast end of Springfield, Massachusetts.  His parents, Edward F. Healey Sr. and Nora Healey were the children of Irish immigrants, both born in Massachusetts. His father worked in the street sprinkler business and later as a contractor in the wood business. Healey had four older sisters and one younger sister.

Healey attended Central High School in Springfield, Massachusetts. He then attended and played college football at the College of the Holy Cross in Worcester, Massachusetts, in 1914 and at Dartmouth College in Hanover, New Hampshire, for three years. In Healey's three years with the Dartmouth football program, the teams compiled records of 5–2–2 (1916), 5–3 (1917), and 6–1–1 (1919). Walter Camp reportedly called Healey "the best tackle I ever saw."

Professional football

Rock Island Independents
Healey began playing professional football with the Rock Island Independents in 1920, the inaugural season of the National Football League (known as the American Professional Football Association until 1922). He helped lead the 1920 Rock Island team to a 6–2–2 record, good for fourth place out of 14 teams.

Healey remained with Rock Island during its 1922 season when the team compiled a 4–2–1 record and finished in fifth place out of 21 teams.

Healey began the 1922 NFL season with Rock Island.  The team opened its season with a 19–14 victory over the Green Bay Packers before losing a close game, 10–6, against the Chicago Bears.  George Halas, owner, coach and player for the Bears, was impressed with Healey's tough tackling, including tackling of Halas, and bought Healey's contract for $100. Healey thus became the first NFL player to be sold to another club. Healey later recalled his pleasure at joining a team with superior facilities: "At Rock Island, we had no showers and seldom a trainer. At Wrigley Field, we had a nice warm place to dress and nice warm showers."

Chicago Bears
Healey spent six seasons with the Bears from 1922 to 1927.  During Healey's tenure with the Bears, the club never had a losing season, winning at least nine games in five of the six seasons. Healey was selected as a first-team All-Pro by at least one major selector each year from 1922 to 1926.

In 1924, he ran more than 30 yards to tackle teammate Oscar Knop who ran the wrong way after intercepting a pass. In 1925, he was the only player to be selected as a first-team All Pro by Collyers Eye magazine, the Green Bay Press-Gazette, and Joseph Carr. In 1926, the Green Bay Press-Gazette called him "the best tackle in the Pro loop," and Bears owner George Halas later called Healey "the most versatile tackle of all time".

Family, later years, and honors
Healey married Lucille Falk in November 1927.  After retiring from football, Healey and his wife lived in South Bend, Indiana, where he worked as a salesman and later sales manager for France Stone Company. Healey and his wife had a son, Thomas, in approximately 1938.  The family later moved to Niles, Michigan.

Interviewed in 1949, Healey opined that, with the development of the platoon system, modern linemen were "something akin to sissies" and added, "In the old days we used to go on the field prepared for 60 minutes of work and nothing short of a broken leg, arm, or ankle could get us out of there."

During his retirement, Healey received numerous honors for his contributions to the sport of football.  These honors include the following:

 In February 1964, Healey was elected to the Pro Football Hall of Fame as a member of its second group of inductees.
 In August 1969, he was selected by the Pro Football Hall of Fame as a tackle on the NFL 1920s All-Decade Team.
 In April 1974, Healey was also elected to the College Football Hall of Fame in the pioneer category.

Healey's wife died in September 1975. Healey died three years later in December 1978 at age 83 from multiple causes, including malnutrition, cardiac and pulmonary failure, and cancer of the stomach and lung. He died at the Cardinal Nursing Home in South Bend, Indiana. His funeral service was held in Niles, Michigan, and he was then buried at Calvary Cemetery in that city.

References

External links
 
 

1894 births
1978 deaths
American football ends
American football guards
American football tackles
Chicago Bears players
Dartmouth Big Green football players
Holy Cross Crusaders football players
Rock Island Independents players
College Football Hall of Fame inductees
Pro Football Hall of Fame inductees
Sportspeople from Springfield, Massachusetts
Players of American football from Massachusetts
American people of Irish descent